Markos Mavromatis (born 5 June 1958) is a Greek retired football midfielder and later manager.

References

1958 births
Living people
Apollon Smyrnis F.C. players
Atromitos F.C. players
Egaleo F.C. players
Greece international footballers
Greek football managers
Apollon Smyrnis F.C. managers
Acharnaikos F.C. managers
Vyzas F.C. managers
Aiolikos F.C. managers
Panargiakos F.C. managers
AO Chania F.C. managers
Ilisiakos F.C. managers
Association football midfielders
Doxa Vyronas F.C. players
Footballers from Athens
Greek footballers